The Belize Elections and Boundaries Department is the hands-on administrator of Belizean electoral politics. It was established in 1989 as a subordinate to the Elections and Boundaries Commission.

Mission statement
As articulated by the EBD itself: "The Elections and Boundaries Department is committed to the enhancement of democracy through the promotion of voter education and the maintenance of a legitimate, impartial, valid electoral process."

Establishment of the EBD

The EBD was established by amendment to the Belize Constitution in 1988. The new amendment allowed the EBD's parent body, the EBC, to confer on it its powers in the constitution and the ROPA. Staffing the department was delegated to the Public Services Commission, which nominated all persons in the department including, after a further amendment in 2001, the Chief Elections Officer. The Department and Chief Elections Officer is now under the control of the Prime Minister's Office and reports to him as well as the commission.

The current chief elections officer is Dorothy Bradley, who succeeded Stuart Leslie in December 2006.

Functions of the EBD
The functions of the department are grouped into three categories: Electoral Administration, Adjustment of Electoral Records, and Voter Education. Under these are the following:

 Organising and directing the registration of voters
 Compiling electoral registers
 Updating and maintaining electoral records
 Organising the conduct of elections
 Preside over the orderly transfer of Electors
 To operate a professional electoral service
 To strengthen public confidence in the electoral system
 To increase the level of voter participation through voter education

Organisation
The EBD's central office is located in Belize City, the municipality with the largest concentration of voters in the country, at P.O. Box 913, Mahogany Street Extension. Other offices include:

Belize District offices:
Sub-Office: San Pedro Ambergris Caye (Belize Rural South only)
Belize Rural North, Central, South, Caribbean Shores, Pickstock, Fort George, Freetown: #92 North Front and Victoria Streets, Belize City
Collet, Mesopotamia, Lake Independence: Cemetery Road, Belize City (as of May 2007)
Albert, Queen's Square, Port Loyola: #89 Euphrates Avenue, Belize City
 Corozal District (Corozal North, Bay, Southeast and Southwest): #37 Second Street North (Lower Flat), Corozal Town
 Orange Walk District (Orange Walk East, South, Central and North Electoral Divisions) :  #1A Santa Maria Street, Orange Walk Town
 Cayo District:
  Cayo North, Central, Northeast: 28 West Street, San Ignacio Town
  Cayo South and Belmopan: Market Square, City of Belmopan
  Cayo West Sub-Office: Benque Viejo del Carmen Post Office (Every second Thursday each month)
 Stann Creek District (Dangriga and Stann Creek West):#16 Tubroose Street, Dangriga
 Toledo District (Toledo East and West): #41 Prince Street, Punta Gorda Town
Sub-Office: #135 Fadden Avenue, Independence Village, Stann Creek District

The offices are staffed with Registering Officers, Assistant Registering Officers, and Data Clerks to take care of the process of registering to vote.

References

External links
 official website of EBC and EBD

1989 establishments in Belize
Government agencies established in 1989
Elections in Belize
Politics of Belize
Political organisations based in Belize